5 Commando was a mercenary unit of the Congolese National Army (Armée Nationale Congolaise, ANC) formed in response to the Simba rebellion. It was active from 1964 to 1967.

Need for mercenaries

In December 1963, a Communist-inspired rebellion broke out in the Congo province of Kwilu.  It was initially a tribal dispute that grew to a challenge against the Central Government.  Although it remained relatively minor, it marked the start of a spreading wave of rebellions against the current Congo central government. As unrest spread, leftist rebels established a Committee for National Liberation in Kivu, inspired by the late Patrice Lumumba.  In 1964, Moïse Tshombe returned from self-exile in Spain and declared himself as the only person who could bring about unity between the warring factions. His popularity and political acumen led him to being appointed as Prime Minister on 6 July 1964.  By August, the rebellion had turned to limited civil war and Simba rebels were marching on Stanleyville, taking control of the city on 5 August 1964.  The routing of the ANC and capitulation of the capital city of Orientale Province came as a shock to the government, Belgium, as well as to the United States.  However, unlike the secessionist uprising of 1961, the United Nations and the United States did not wish to engage in direct intervention against the rebels. Based on Tshombe's 1961 experiences in Katanga, as well as the American's reluctance for direct involvement, the Prime Minister contracted mercenaries to address the rebellion.

Recruitment and formation
In July 1964, Jerry Puren (a former mercenary officer in the Katangese Air Force) started recruiting mercenaries to support the Congolese Army on request of the Congolese Prime Minister Moïse Tshombe. Puren focused his efforts in South Africa and alerted 200 men of possible employment as mercenaries. The ex-British military officer, Major "Mad" Mike Hoare, had known Tshombe and had served as one of his officers in 1961 and was the designated commander for the mercenary force. Puren was to be in charge of air operations.  Second in command was former executive officer of the Rhodesian Special Air Services, Alastair Wicks, who had also served with both Hoare and Tshombe in 1961.

Recruitment centers were established in South Africa and in both North and Southern Rhodesia. Hoare placed newspaper ads in the South African Johannesburg Star newspaper and in Salisbury newspapers (modern Harare, Zimbabwe) calling upon physically fit white men "...capable of marching 20 miles per day and who were fond of combat and were "tremendous romantics" to join 5 Commando." Contracts were for six months and basic pay was advertised at US$280 per month, plus US$420 danger pay and 37,000 Congolese francs as a monthly allowance.  NCOs received basic pay of US$400 and senior officers were compensated with US$1,100 per month.  Compensation of US$19,000 was payable to next of kin in the event of death. 

"Adventurers" from South Africa, many of whom had fought with Moise Tshombe in the secession of Katanga Province, signed up, as did recruits from Rhodesia and Nyasaland. The Congolese, as well as officials of other African states, deeply resented the recruitment of South Africans and Rhodesians; this lead to Tshombe frequently assuring the OAU that he would replace the white mercenaries with African replacements as soon as they could be recruited and trained. 5 Commando eventually comprised volunteers from South Africa, Rhodesia, the United Kingdom, Belgium and Germany. Hoare described the men from the initial batch of recruits as being of "alarmingly low" standard with a "..high proportion of alcoholics, drunks, booze artists, bums and layabouts". He also complained about drug addicts and homosexuals. Belgian colonels Frédéric Vandewalle and Louis Marlière expressed similar doubts about the quality of the recruits, with the latter commenting that they were "pirates who are not worth anything in battle." United States Ambassador George Godley described the unit as "an uncontrolled lot of toughs [...] who consider looting or safe-cracking fully within their prerogatives".

Organizationally, 5 Commando was divided into eight sub-units, designated 51 to 58 Commando, with two officers and three sergeants per sub-unit. These were reinforced platoon sized units.  The first orders issued to Hoare by the chief of the ANC, Maj. Gen. Joseph Desire Mobutu instructed Hoare to: (a.) Deploy a company of 200 immediately to Kamina with the mission to retake Manono, Albertville, Fizi and Uvira. (2.) Designate 300 volunteers formed into six platoons for the six mobile groups that had been planned and (3.) Assign 500 volunteers in a company with elements of the ANC to immediately retake Stanleyville. By 2 September 1964 recruiting had stopped as 1,000 recruits had been signed up, but the facilities, training and organization of the Commando made the attainment of the first orders highly unlikely.

The Belgian government dispatched Colonel Vandewalle to the Congo; during a meeting with Tshombe, Vandewalle clarified he would not tolerate political interference with military operations. Consequently, he was given authority to work directly with the Belgian logistics units, the CIA's air support, and the mercenaries. As a result, Belgian logistics units funded 5 Commando through providing them with weapons, ammunition, trucks and uniforms. After a few weeks of training, 5 Commando went into combat.

Operations
Early on, 5 Commando was plagued by poor logistics and a lack of discipline. A few days after the first group of mercenaries for the unit in the Congo, Hoare launched two attacks against the Simba-held city of Albertville. Both were repulsed. The lack of equipment, inadequate training, and irregularities in pay damaged the unit's morale and the unit initially sustained a high casualty rate. Over the course of late 1964, the Congolese government improved the financial and logistical situation while Hoare screened out soldiers he deemed unfit. By the end of the year, 5 Commando still suffered from disciplinary problems. By early 1965, the Congolese government had driven rebels out of much of the eastern Congo, but the situation remained unstable. 5 Commando was tasked with securing the border, reestablishing lines of communication, and clearing out pockets of resistance, especially in the Fizi-Baraka and Uvari areas.

5 Commando played a significant role in rescuing hostages, particularly European hostages, from Simba rebels.  These actions frequently made headlines in Europe and made the mercenaries popular heroes for a limited period.  Despite these headlines, the mercenaries supplemented their wages by searching bodies for cash and blowing bank safes in Stanleyville.

The commando received ongoing support from the United States CIA through air support operations as well as by providing and crewing Swift boats for operations on Lake Tanganyika.  The boats were used to support 5 Commando (often under 5 Commando command) and were crewed by Miami-Cuban, anti-Castro crews, recruited by and paid by the CIA.  Washington insisted that there be "no overt relationship with the mercenaries," but this relationship between the CIA and 5 Commando could not be kept secret.  This was further evidenced by frequent meetings between Mike Hoare and later John Peters and the CIA Congo Station Chief, Larry Devlin.  Besides tactical support, the United States provided F-250 trucks and 7-ton cargo vehicles for operational use by the mercenaries.

Peters assumed command of 5 Commando from Hoare in December 1965. Georg Schroeder late assumed command from him.

Alleged war crimes
5 Commando were known for unsanctioned killing, torture, looting and rapes in recaptured rebel areas. In a press interview, Hoare himself described his men as "appalling thugs". Some South African members of the unit were later convicted of manslaughter by Congolese courts.

Disbandment

Military coup and ousting of Tshombe
5 Commando became highly efficient in working with the ANC Congolese troops and they cleared eastern Congo of Simba rebels and almost captured Che Guevara in his camp, forcing him to escape to Tanzania, but these victories came at a political cost. On 13 October 1965, Congolese President Joseph Kasa-Vubu relieved Prime Minister Tshombe of his duties and replaced him with Évariste Kimba, considering Tshombe as being too ambitious and very unpopular in the country and within neighboring African states. Mobutu shortly thereafter removed both President Kasavubu and Prime Minister Kimba in a coup, appointing himself as president.  Tshombe had been a friend of, and protector to, 5 and 6 Commando and his ousting immediately caused uncertainty and insecurity within 5 Commando. Jerry Puren left the Congo with Tshombe for exile in Belgium. Mike Hoare and Alistair Wicks did not renew their contracts and left the Congo.  John Peters, then commanding officer of 5 Commando, continued to pledge his—and the unit's—loyalty to the government and continued operations in southern Congo.

Mercenary revolt

Jerry Puren, once in Belgium, was informed of a plan to reinstall Tshombe as Prime Minister.  The Baka Regiment, together with the mercenary commandos led by Jean Schramme and that of Bob Denard, had committed to support the plan.   Puren refused to take part in the counter-coup and Mike Hoare, Alistair Wicks and John Peters and Hugh van Oppen (Peters and van Oppen were still serving members of 5 Commando) were approached to support the revolt  but all refused.  On 23 July, the Baku Regiment of the ANC and 11, 12, 13 and 14 Commandos revolted to support the exiled Tshombe, killing the commander of the ANC and taking control of the radio station in Stanleyville. 6 Commando, led by Bob Denard opposed the uprising and notified the government, calling for support to put down the uprising.  A stalemate ensued in Stanleyville until September 1966, when Denard attacked the Katanga units in the city.  5 Commando re-deployed from southern Congo to support 6 Commando, to cover any Katanga escape routes from the city.  A truce was negotiated and the Katanga troops not killed were given amnesty, while officers were transported to prisons in Elisabethville. The rebellion had failed and Mobutu remained secure as president.  The failed rebellion did, however, reinforced the perception of the loyalty of 5 and 6 Commando towards Mobutu.

After this failed revolt, Puren (still in Belgium) started his own plan to reinstall Tshombe; selecting Jean Schramme of 10 Commando to lead the second revolt. After much planning and including Denard in the planning, Schramme launched surprise attacks on Stanleyville, Bakavu and Kindu.  Stanleyville and Bakavu were taken with little resistance, but the mercenaries faced strong resistance in Kindu.  The ANC forces recovered Stanleyville, executing several mercenaries, with Schramme withdrawing from the city to establish a stronghold in Bukavu.  Mobutu issued an ultimatum, ordering Schramme to evacuate Bakavu within ten days.  The ANC attacked on expiry of the ultimatum and on 5 November 1966 Schramme, together with 150 mercenaries, 800 Katanga soldiers and 1,500 women and children fled across the Rwandan border and were disarmed and interred by the Rwandan military at Shangugu.  The second mercenary revolt had also collapsed. Elsewhere in other skirmishes, many mercenaries were massacred and the surviving European mercenaries were evacuated by the Red Cross.

Disbandment
Mobutu ordered all recruitment for 5 Commando to cease in March 1967. The unit was disbanded in April  on Mobutu's order. He likely did so for three reasons; to avoid the expense of paying the mercenaries, to forestall any attempts by Tshombe to use the unit in a coup attempt, and to avoid the potential embarrassment of employing white mercenaries when the Congo was due to host the Organisation of African Unity annual conference in September.

Notes and references

Footnotes

References

Bibliography

See also

In popular culture
 The film The Wild Geese, made in 1978: directed by Andrew V. McLaglen and starring Richard Burton, Roger Moore, Richard Harris, and Hardy Krüger was based on the formation and tribulations of Mike Hoare and 5 Commando.

Further reading / viewing
 Video:  Mercenaries in The Congo Crisis 1964: Mad Mike Hoare's 5 Commando
 List of members of 5 Commando may be found at this website: 

Commando units and formations
Congo Crisis
Counterinsurgency organizations
Mercenary units and formations
Reconnaissance units and formations